Christianity has been, historically, a Middle Eastern religion with its origin in Judaism. 
Eastern Christianity refers collectively to the Christian traditions and churches which developed in the Middle East, Egypt, Asia Minor, the Far East, Balkans, Eastern Europe, Northeastern Africa and southern India over several centuries of religious antiquity.  It is contrasted with Western Christianity, which developed in Western Europe.
As a historical definition the term relates to the earliest Christian communities and their long-standing traditions that still exist.

Overview

Christianity as a religion was founded by Jesus Christ (8–2 BC to 29–36 AD) and his Twelve Apostles. Christianity was an underground movement, having been in conflict with Judaism and then also with the Pagan Roman Empire (see Persecution of early Christians by the Romans). Much of early Christianity as an underground movement had no overt or established churches, as many of the Early Christians attended Synagogue and prayer meetings at their homes and other secret locations. Church meant gathering or community more than building or structure. During the times of persecutions and secrecy, some did have churches which were literally underground, as in the underground cities of  Anatolia and the catacomb churches of Rome. Many churches which were established as primary in authority, were established by the early apostles. This tradition is outside of the canon of the bible
but is tied to the canon, in the sense that each church used their respective Gospel given to them by their communities' founding Apostle. To establish Christianity in their respective regions. Tradition stated that St Mark founded in the small Jewish Christian community in Egypt as the Patriarch of Alexandria, the Egyptian and therefore by proxy the African churches or communities.
That St James brother of Jesus (by Eastern tradition a step brother to Jesus as Joseph was a widower) as the established first Patriarch of Jerusalem. St Peter being the establisher of the church in Jerusalem with St James. Saint Peter as also the first Patriarch of Antioch. Whereas by tradition the churches of Greece and the Mediterranean Islands were founded by St Paul and St John, St Paul and St Peter by tradition are noted as the founders of the church of Rome. The churches of Babylon and India being founded by St Thomas and also by Saint Paul. The churches of southern Asia, Armenia, Bulgaria, Ukraine, Georgia, the Balkans and Eastern Bloc states and Constantinople by St Andrew. St Jude and St Bartholomew as founders of the church of Armenia. St Matthew being the patron saint of Italy, though Orthodox tradition has him martyred in Ethiopia.
There were, of course, other communities established by Christians that were not the original Apostles. Some Christian communities were established by the Seventy Disciples of the Apostles (see Thaddeus of Edessa and Ananias of Damascus). Also important were the Seven Deacons.

Ethnic groups

Jewish Christians, Albanian Christians, Assyrian Christians, Aramean Christians, Armenian Christians, Georgian Christians, Maronite Christians, Arab Christians, Indian Christians, Greek Christians, Egyptian Christians, Ethiopian Christians, Persian Christians, Kurdish Christians, Turkish Christians, Slavic Christians, Maltese Christians and Eastern European (Balkan) Christians.

The Pentarchy

The churches that were the original churches founded by the Apostles were later established as authority centers under the Pentarchy of Patriarchs.
 Rome (Sts. Peter and Paul), i.e. the Pope, the only Pentarch in the Western Roman Empire.
 Alexandria (St. Mark), currently in Egypt
 Antioch (St. Peter), currently in Turkey
 Jerusalem (St. James), currently in Israel/Palestine
 Constantinople (St. Andrew), currently in Turkey

Common characteristics of Eastern Christianity

Eastern Christianity
The church as established in the Middle East was done so under the concept of unity i.e. catholic and or ecumenical. For the earliest Christian communities the concept of unity was one where the church communities agreed on a doctrinal understanding of Christianity. Such an understanding was based on the tradition of unity within the different ancient Christian communities. One such tradition is the biblical texts used by each of the ancient communities or churches. Unity was established in what was taught to the communities by Christ and then his apostles which was doctrinal in its expression. When various persons or groups within the many ancient Christian communities began to come at odds with innovations or interpretations of the traditions of Christianity, the communities set out to clarify the validity of the variation in the comparison to traditional understanding. To establish why this change was to be accepted or rejected. As such was the case of the first council in Jerusalem. The later councils where prompted to clarify tradition and address what was proper and what was improper. Proper being what was established by Jesus Christ and then his apostles, then the Seventy and the clergy of the churches and the Patristic text, that take their lineage directly back to the Apostolic era. Innovations being that which changed the understanding that Christian communities had as the basis for the understanding and definition of their religion. Such innovations, whereas the community believe, at the expense of tradition.
Tradition being then established as dogma. A dogma which mystically created a relationship between each individual and the personal Triune God. Any innovation which cut off this relationship and was therefore to be condemned.

This right believing and right teaching was to first establish in each individual a personal relationship with Christ, the God. This original teaching established by a community of persons that through these traditions created and then maintained a relationship with God. As various teachings appeared the Church as a united community addressed and confirmed or denied the teaching or teachings. Tradition was the cornerstone to how teachings were to be deemed valid since tradition itself cultivated a living relationship with the living God. The councils which were conducted after the legalization of Christianity were done so to define what Christianity and a Christian was. This in contrast to Paganism and the Judaism and the various non-traditional Christian beliefs of the time. The Christian communities not within the regions of the Empire of Rome still communicated with one another and it was the break out of the sectarian and deemed new to tradition, teachings of Arius that caused the communities to gather to define what a Christian was and to use this definition to counter the teachings of Arianism.

Eastern Christian Ecclesiastics

Ecclesiastical structure of the Eastern churches
The ecclesiastical structure of the church is based on Judaism, as was the lay out of the church once Christianity became legal. Systematic persecution of the early Christian church caused it to be an underground movement. The first above-ground churches were officially built in Armenia (see Echmiadzin). Armenia was the first country to legalize Christianity around 301 AD under King Tiridates III and also embrace it as the state religion in 310 AD. However, illegal churches before "Christian legalization" are mentioned throughout church history; such an example would be in the persecutions of Diocletian. Of the underground churches that existed before legalization, some are recorded to have existed as the catacombs in Europe, Rome, and also in the underground cities of Anatolia such as Derinkuyu Underground City (also see Cave monastery). Today the gates though which Paul escaped, named Bab Kisan, and mentioned in the Second Epistle to the Corinthians, have been converted into a church in Paul's memory. This is a structure still standing that dates from the time of the Apostles.

Ecclesiastic services or liturgy

Liturgical services and in specific the Eucharist service, are based on repeating the actions of Jesus ("do this in remembrance of me"), using the bread and wine, and saying his words (known as the words of the institution). The church has the rest of the liturgical ritual being rooted in the Jewish Passover, Siddur, Seder, and synagogue services, including the singing of hymns (especially the Psalms) and reading from the Scriptures (Old and New Testament). The final uniformity of liturgical services became solidified after the church established a Biblical canon, being based on the Apostolic Constitutions and Clementine literature. As a common characteristic of Eastern Christianity each shares the standard liturgy structure which came from the Liturgy of St James (see The Divine Liturgy of Saint James).

Clergy 
The clergy of the Eastern Churches are the bishops, priests, and deacons, the same offices identified in the New Testament and found in the early church. Bishops include archbishops, metropolitans, and patriarchs.
Priests (also called presbyters or elders) include archpriests, protopresbyters, hieromonks (priest-monks) and archimandrites (senior hieromonks). Deacons also include hierodeacons (deacon-monks) archdeacons and protodeacons; subdeacons, however, are not deacons, and comprise a separate office that is not to be major clergy, as do readers, acolytes and others. Bishops are usually drawn from the ranks of the monks, and are required to be celibate; however, a non-monastic priest may be ordained to the episcopate if he no longer lives with his wife (following Canon XII of the Quinisext Council). In contemporary usage such a non-monastic priest is usually tonsured to the monastic state at some point prior to his consecration to the episcopacy.

Ascetic or Charismatic orders 
 Monastic or Ascetic Orders

Pre-Ecumenical Christian heresies

Meetings between Christian communities or churches were held before the Ecumenical councils. These meetings however were not as large because  the Christian Church was still an illegal community. These early meetings and correspondence lead to the clarification of early heresies.

 
Antinomianism
Donatist
Ebionites
Gnosticism
Marcionism
Millennialism
Monarchianism
Montanism
Sabellianism

Post Legalized Christianity and the Ecumenical Councils
 
Arianism
Apollinarism
Audianism
Anomoeanism
Iconoclasm
Messalians
Macedonians (religious group)
Paulicianism/Euchites
Pelagianism/Semipelagianism
Priscillianism
Psilanthropism
Socinianism

Orthodox Christianity

Roman Empire and Byzantine Orthodoxy
The creation of the Universal Christian church is a complicated and long history. Hebrew (Semitic), Egyptian, Greek, Roman and Arab Christian communities of the Mediterranean faced various opposition from governments, opposing religions, and splinter groups from within their own faith. This catholic movement within the cradle of Christianity was to unite all Christians into a Universal church based on Christ through tradition, faith and community. The communities sought to balance unity with truth. The truth of these early groups was a shared truth that was communicated to each successive group based on early tradition. Once documented it was the understanding of tradition that caused the various schisms and internal conflicts. Christianity as first established was united Christians from within the Imperium Romanum. The Roman Empire ruled the Middle Eastern coastal communities and the Mediterranean during the time of Christ. As Christians within the Roman Empire many different nationalities and ethnic peoples where subject to Roman rule.

Though the power of the Empire was seated in Rome the greatest unifying force of the Empire was its foundations, which were built on the conquests of Alexander the Great. It was the Hellenistic Empire which established a unified civilization of the Mediterranean and Greater Middle East, parts of Africa, India and southern Europe. With its conquests of the Mediterranean including Egypt and Babylon, that Rome inherited by its absorption of the Hellenistic Empire. The unity was based on the implementation of common or Koine Greek as the language of the Empire. It was this language that the earliest Christians' text were written in.

A marked change in the life of the church occurred in 313 when Emperor Constantine the Great proclaimed the Edict of Milan and legalized Christianity within the Roman Empire. As the communities united by a Christian faith and tradition lived on to see the legalization of their religion they were faced with the need to address various misconceptions and unclear definitions of their faith and tradition. This culminated in the early writings of the Church fathers and then later the Ecumenical councils set to define the Christian faith and tradition. It is this origin founded by Christ, his apostles, the seventy disciples, Patristics church fathers, ecumenical councils, teaching of the Holiest Christians and witness of martyrs that the Eastern Christian Orthodox community is based on.
These all being traditions that found expression in art, literature, architecture, linguistics and ascetic activities of these earliest Christian communities. The Eastern Christian communities were united as a whole. Though as with all groups of humans not every single person who claimed to be a Christian was accepted as a member.

Saint Thomas Christians

St. Thomas Christians are natives of  the southern Indian state of Kerala. These Christians of Malabar trace their roots back to St. Thomas, the Apostle who arrived along the Malabar Coast in the year AD 52. In their tradition, St. Thomas is referred to as Mar Thoma Sleeha which translates roughly as Lord/Saint Thomas the Apostle.

St Thomas Christians had a unique identity till the arrival of Portuguese in India, who tried to convert St. Thomas Christians in their area of control to the Latin Church through the Synod of Diamper of 1599. As a result of this foreign intervention into their culture there are several present day St. Thomas denominations, primarily in the Catholic and Oriental Orthodox traditions.

Among the St. Thomas Christians, now the largest church in terms of membership is the Syro-Malabar Church, a major archepiscopal sui juris Church in Communion with the Bishop of Rome with a membership approaching four million adherents. The other denominations include the Malankara Syriac Orthodox Church (Jacobite Syrian Church), Malankara Orthodox Syrian Church (Indian Orthodox Church), Malankara Marthoma Syrian Church and  Malankara Syriac Catholic Church (Syro-Malankara Catholic Church).

Byzantine Rite Lutheranism 

Byzantine Rite Lutheranism arose in the Ukrainian Lutheran Church around 1926. It sprung up in the region of Galicia and its rites are based on the Liturgy of St. John Chrysostom. The Church suffered persecution under the Communist régime, which implemented a policy of state atheism.

Ecumenical Councils

Eastern Orthodoxy

The heresy of Arius was rejected in the community of Christians in the
regions of the Pentarchy. This also included the communities of Christians of the far East (the Assyrian Churches) and the churches of Africa (Ethiopians). Churches that were not under the control of Rome. Several doctrinal disputes from the 4th century onwards led to the calling of ecumenical councils which from a traditional perspective, are the culmination and also a continuation of previous church synods. The first ecumenical council in part was a continuation of Trinitarian doctrinal issues addressed in pre-legalization of Christianity councils or synods (see Synods of Antioch between 264-269AD). These ecumenical councils with their doctrinal formulations are pivotal in the history of Christianity in general and to the history of Eastern Christianity. The tradition was not new, but was now public and no longer were the ancient Christian communities forced to hide, but could now meet with all of the clergy out in the open. Even with churches outside the regions of the Byzantine Empire. This would somewhat change.

Church of the East
It was not until the third ecumenical council (see First Council of Ephesus) that the Assyrian Church of the East and the churches of Asia, parted ways in schism with the Eastern Orthodox Church, the church of Byzantium which was still united with Rome.

Oriental Orthodox Church
Later councils to define the tenets of the community of Christianity, caused the Oriental Orthodox community to part in schism as well (see the Council of Chalcedon). The churches or communities at this point were National churches so a great deal of nationalistic sentiments played into the various schisms.

Nationalistic ecclesiastical characteristics
There was a degree of nationalistic animosity between the different communities that were united in Christ. Past historical conflicts between these different groups also feed the sentiments of division. As an understanding of the sensitivities of ethnic and or nationalistic characteristics, the early churches did implement
nationalistic identities. Hence the establishment of the Greek, Coptic, Armenian, Russian churches. This was balanced with the tradition of churches also being named more for location rather than Nationalistic identity i.e. the church of Antioch or the church of Jerusalem.
 Alexandria (St. Mark), currently in Egypt note: After the Council of Chalcedon the Coptic churches and Byzantine churches went into schism.
 Antioch (St. Peter), currently in Turkey
 Jerusalem (St. James), currently in Israel/Palestine
 Constantinople (St. Andrew), currently in Turkey
 Serbian Patriarch
 Patriarch of Moscow
 Patriarch of Romania

Syriac Christianity

Syriac Christianity has a long history. It was traditionally centered in Persian ruled Assyria/Mesopotamia and Roman ruled Syria. Christianity had a strong presence from the early days of the Church, particularly among the Semitic peoples of the region who spoke various dialects of Aramaic, the language of Jesus Christ. Syriac Christianity was divided into West Syrian and Eastern Rite traditions. The two major bodies in the West Syrian tradition were the Syriac Orthodox Church, an Oriental Orthodox (Monophysite) church, and the Maronite Church, an Eastern Catholic Church in communion with the pope, though splits and realignments happened later. The East Syrian tradition was represented by the Church of the East, the Christian church of Persian ruled Assyria and Mesopotamia.

The Church of the East (most of whose members are ethnic Assyrians) traced its origins to the evangelism of Saint Paul and Saint Thomas. The Church traces its roots after the apostles to the See of Babylon, said to have been founded by Saint Thomas. In the 5th century the Church of the East offered protection to followers of the Nestorian movement, declared heretical in the Roman Empire at the First Council of Ephesus. As such it accepted only the first two Ecumenical Councils — the Council of Nicaea and the First Council of Constantinople — as defining its faith tradition. Despite severe persecutions, the Church of the East prospered under the Parthian and Sasanian empires and, following the Muslim conquest of Persia, the Islamic Caliphate. During the era of the Islamic Empire, the Church of the East was made a protected dhimmi community and largely maintained their autonomy; in a fatwa, the Islamic Prophet Muhammad demanded the protection of the Assyrian people of Mesopotamia.

The Church of the East spread widely through Asia, establishing churches and dioceses in India (the Saint Thomas Christians), Central Asia, and China, home to a Nestorian community from the 7th–10th centuries and again in the 13th–14th centuries. Subsequently, however, a series of misfortunes sent the church into decline, and by the 14th century it was largely confined to Mesopotamia/Iraq, south eastern Anatolia/Turkey, north western Persia/Iran and north eastern Syria and the Malabar Coast of India. It remains centered in these areas to this day. In the 16th century, the church went into schism, resulting in the formation of two churches with rival patriarchs: the Assyrian Church of the East and the Chaldean Catholic Church, which eventually entered into communion with Rome.

Ecumenism between the Assyrian Church and the Roman Catholic Church is an ongoing process. Most recently, on November 11, 1994, a historic meeting of Patriarch Mar Dinkha IV and Pope John Paul II took place in the Vatican and a Common Christological Declaration was signed. One side effect of this meeting was that the Assyrian Church's relationship to the Chaldean Catholic Church was improved.

Oriental Orthodoxy

Oriental Orthodoxy refers to the communion of Eastern Christian Churches that recognize only the first three ecumenical councils — the First Council of Nicaea (325 AD), the First Council of Constantinople (381) and the Council of Ephesus (431) — and reject the dogmatic definitions of the Council of Chalcedon (451). Hence, these Churches are also called Old Oriental Churches. Despite potentially confusing nomenclature, Oriental Orthodox churches are distinct from the churches that collectively refer to themselves as Eastern Orthodoxy.

The Coptic Orthodox Church of Alexandria is considered the spiritual leader of the Oriental Orthodox Churches. The spiritual leadership is not in the same sense understood for the one extended among the Eastern Orthodox Churches to the Church of Constantinople; it is however, in the spirit of respect and honor for the Apostolic Throne of Alexandria. It does not give any prerogatives, jurisdiction or rights to the Church of Alexandria in any way as in the Eastern Orthodox Churches. Historically, the church has been labeled monophysite because it rejected the decisions of the Council of Chalcedon, which condemned monophysitism. The Armenian body of the Church officially severed ties with the West in 554, during the second Council of Dvin where the dyophysite formula of the Council of Chalcedon was rejected.
The Oriental Orthodox Church argues that this is a wrong description of its position, as it considers Monophysitism, as taught by Eutyches and condemned at Chalcedon, a heresy and only disagrees with the formula defined by that council. The Oriental church instead adheres to the doctrine defined by Cyril of Alexandria, considered as a saint by the Chalcedonian churches as well, who described Christ as being of one incarnate nature, where both divine and human nature are united. To distinguish this from Eutychian and other versions of Monophysitism this position is called miaphysitism.

Oriental Orthodoxy developed in reaction to Chalcedon on the eastern limit of the Byzantine Empire and in Egypt and Syria.  In those locations, there are now also Eastern Orthodox Patriarchs, but the rivalry between the Eastern Orthodox and the Oriental Orthodox has largely vanished in the centuries since schism. In recent times, both Chalcedonian and anti-Chalcedonian churches have developed a deeper understanding for each other's positions, recognizing the substantial agreement while maintaining their respective theological language. Hence, the Monophysite label is avoided when describing the Armenians' or Copts' belief regarding the Nature of Christ.

Ecumenism between Eastern Orthodoxy and Oriental Orthodoxy
Both the Eastern Orthodox and Oriental Orthodox churches formally believe themselves to be the continuation of the true church and the other to have fallen into schism, although in the past 20 years much work had been done toward ecumenism or reconciliation between the Oriental and Eastern Orthodox churches. There has been an attempt to achieve ecumenism between the Antiochian and Oriental Orthodox churches. At Chambesy in Switzerland, plenary talks were held resulting in agreements in 1989, 1990 and 1993. All the official representatives of the Eastern Orthodox and the Oriental Orthodox reached agreement in these dialogues that the Christological differences between the two communions are more a matter of emphasis than of substance.  Although elements in a number of the Eastern Orthodox Churches have criticized the apparent consensus reached by the representatives at Chambesy, the patriarch and holy synod of the Antiochian Orthodox Church welcomed the agreements as positive moves towards a sharing in the Love of God, and a rejection of the hatred of insubstantial division. As recommended in the Second Chambesy Agreement of 1990, the Antiochian (Eastern) Orthodox Patriarch Ignatius IV formally met with the Syriac (Oriental) Orthodox Patriarch, Ignatius Zakka I,  on July 22, 1991.  At that meeting, the two patriarchs signed a pastoral agreement which called for "complete and mutual respect between the two churches." It also prohibited the passing of faithful from one church to the other, envisaged joint meetings of the two holy synods when appropriate, and provided for future guidelines for inter-communion of the faithful and Eucharistic concelebration by the clergy of the two churches. The Church of Antioch expects these guidelines to be issued when the faithful of both churches are ready, but not before. Patriarch Ignatius has also overseen participation in a bilateral commission with the Melkite Greek Catholic Church, which is exploring ways of healing the 18th century schism between the Melkite Catholics and the Antiochian Orthodox.  In an unprecedented event, Melkite Patriarch Maximos V addressed a meeting of the Orthodox holy synod in October 1996. The members of the holy synod of Antioch continue to explore greater communication and more friendly meetings with their Syriac, Melkite, and Maronite brothers and sisters, who all share a common heritage.

The following Oriental Orthodox churches are autocephalous and in full communion:
 Egyptian Coptic Orthodox Church
 Armenian Apostolic Church
 Eritrean Orthodox Tewahdo Church
 Ethiopian Orthodox Tewahedo Church
 Indian Orthodox Church
 Syriac Orthodox Church

See also

History of Christianity
History of the Eastern Orthodox Church
History of the Russian Orthodox Church
Timeline of Orthodoxy in Greece
Timeline of Eastern Orthodoxy in America

References

Bibliography
 The Spirituality of the Christian East: A systematic handbook by Tomas Spidlik, Cistercian Publications Inc Kalamazoo Michigan 1986

Filmography
 'The last Assyrians', a history of Aramaic speaking Christians. Documentary film 

 
Eastern Christianity
Christianity in the Arab world
History of Eastern Orthodoxy
History of Oriental Orthodoxy
History of Christianity in Ukraine
Eastern Christianity in Africa
Eastern Christianity in Egypt
Eastern Christianity in Iran
Eastern Christianity in Iraq
Assyrian Church of the East
Coptic Orthodox Church
Church patriarchs
Christianity in the Byzantine Empire